This is a list of LGBT Jews. Each person is both Jewish (by birth or conversion according to Jewish law, or identifies as Jewish via ancestry) and has stated publicly that they are bisexual, gay, lesbian, pansexual, transgender, and/or queer or questioning (LGBTQ), or identify as a member of the LGBTQ community. Being both Jewish and LGBTQ is a canonical (recognized) example of some facet of each person on this list, such that the below listed person's fame or significance flows from being both Jewish and LGBTQ.

In Queer Theory and the Jewish Question, editors Daniel Boyarin, Daniel Itzkovitz, and Ann Pellegrini explain:

Politicians
 Roberta Achtenberg, former HUD assistant secretary
 Yossi Avni-Levy, diplomat
 Volker Beck, German politician and member of The Greens
 Sam Bell, Rhode Island Senate member.
 David Cicilline, the Mayor of Providence, Rhode Island, member of the United States House of Representatives 
 Barney Frank, Democratic member of the United States House of Representatives
Marcia Freedman, former member of the Israeli Knesset
Ron Galperin, City Controller of Los Angeles, first openly gay person elected citywide in Los Angeles 
Nitzan Horowitz, Israeli Member of Knesset, first openly gay person elected to the Knesset
 Rebecca Kaplan, City Councilmember At-Large, Oakland, California
 Anne Kronenberg, American political administrator
 Mark Leno, California State Assembly member
 Carole Migden, former California State Senator
 Harvey Milk, former San Francisco city supervisor, first openly gay person to be elected to public office in the United States
 Jeremy Moss, Michigan State Senator
 Amir Ohana, first openly gay right-wing member of the Knesset
 Jared Polis, Colorado Democrat and a former Internet entrepreneur; became the first openly gay non-incumbent male elected to Congress; elected Governor of Colorado in 2018
 Stan Rosenberg, President Pro Tempore, Massachusetts State Senate
 Barbra Casbar Siperstein, first openly transgender member of the Democratic National Committee
 Itzik Shmuli, politician

Religious LGBT figures

Rebecca Alpert, lesbian professor in the Departments of Religion and Women's Studies at Temple University
 Lionel Blue, first British rabbi publicly to come out as gay; wrote Godly and Gay (1981)
 Deborah Brin, one of the first openly gay rabbis and one of the first hundred women rabbis
 Denise Eger, first female and the first openly gay President of the Board of Rabbis of Southern California; in March 2015 she became president of the Central Conference of American Rabbis, the largest and oldest rabbinical organization in North America, and she was the first openly gay person to hold that position
 Steven Greenberg (b. 1956), first out Orthodox rabbi and staff member of CLAL
 Dario David Hunter, American-Israeli lawyer, rabbi, educator and politician considered the first Muslim-born person to be ordained as a rabbi
 Jason Klein, first openly gay man to head a national rabbinical association of a major US Jewish denominations (2013), when he was chosen as president of the Reconstructionist Rabbinical Association; also the first Hillel director to hold the presidency; as of this election, he is the executive director of Hillel at the University of Maryland, Baltimore County, a post he has held since 2006; he will be president of the Reconstructionist Rabbinical Association for two years
 Sharon Kleinbaum, first rabbi of Congregation Beit Simchat Torah, one of the most influential rabbis in the United States
 Debra Kolodny, openly bisexual American rabbi; edited the first anthology by bisexual people of faith, Blessed Bi Spirit (2000), to which she contributed "Hear, I Pray You, This Dream Which I Have Dreamed," about Jewish identity and bisexuality 
 Amichai Lau-Lavie, founder of Storahtelling and Lab-Shul.
 Sandra Lawson, became the first openly gay African-American and the first African-American admitted to the Reconstructionist Rabbinical College in 2011; became the first openly gay, female, black rabbi in the world in 2018 
 Stacy Offner, openly lesbian American rabbi who accomplished important firsts for women and lesbians in the Jewish community;  first openly lesbian rabbi in a traditional congregation; first openly lesbian rabbi hired by a mainstream Jewish congregation;  first female rabbi in Minnesota; first rabbi elected chaplain of the Minnesota Senate; first female vice president of the Union for Reform Judaism; first woman to serve on the US national rabbinical pension board 
 Toba Spitzer, first openly lesbian or gay person chosen to head a rabbinical association in the United States in 2007, when she was elected president of the Reconstructionist Rabbinical Association
 Abby Stein, transgender activist, former Hasidic Jew
 Margaret Wenig, American rabbi and instructor of liturgy and homiletics at Hebrew Union College-Jewish Institute of Religion; in 1976, she and Naomi Janowitz published Siddur Nashim, the first Jewish prayer book to refer to God using female pronouns and imagery; in 1990 she wrote the sermon "God Is a Woman and She Is Growing Older," which as of 2011 has been published ten times (three times in German) and preached by rabbis from Australia to California
 Sherwin Wine (1928-2007), rabbi and founding figure in Humanistic Judaism
 Ron Yosef (b. 1974) (Hebrew: רון יוסף), Orthodox rabbi who helped found the Israeli organization Hod, which represents gay and lesbian Orthodox Jews; his organization has played a central part in the recent reevaluation of the role of religious homosexuals in the Israeli Religious Zionist movement
 Reuben Zellman, American teacher, author, and assistant rabbi and music director at Congregation Beth El in Berkeley, California; first openly transgender person accepted to the Reform Jewish seminary Hebrew Union College-Jewish Institute of Religion in Cincinnati (2003); ordained by the seminary's Los Angeles campus in 2010

Academics
Allan Bloom, philosopher
 Judith Butler, philosopher
 Yuval Noah Harari, professor and author
 Martin Duberman, historian
 Uzi Even, Israeli chemist and former Knesset member
 Lillian Faderman, American lesbian historian
 Jack Halberstam, Professor of English and Director for the Center for Feminist Research at the University of Southern California
 Magnus Hirschfeld, sexologist and activist
 Ron Huberman, Israeli-born CEO of Chicago Public Schools
 Fritz Klein, psychiatrist and sexologist
 Joy Ladin, American professor and poet, first openly transgender professor at an Orthodox Jewish institution
 Arlene Istar Lev, clinical social worker, family therapist, and educator
 George Mosse, historian
 Oliver Sacks, British neurologist, naturalist, and author
 Ludwig Wittgenstein, philosopher

Show business
 Chantal Akerman, film director
 Simon Amstell, comedian and television presenter
 Assi Azar, TV personality
 Neal Baer, TV writer, producer 
 Orna Banai, actress, comedian
 Michael Bennett, choreographer and musical theatre director
 Ilene Chaiken, creator of The L Word
 George Cukor, film director
 Jason Danino-Holt, news anchor, TV presenter
 Brandon Flynn, actor
 Harvey Fierstein, actor and playwright
 Diane Flacks, Canadian Jewish comedic actress, screenwriter and playwright
 Eytan Fox, Israeli film director
 Stephen Fry, actor, comedian and writer
 Victor Garber, actor, comedian and writer
 Judy Gold, stand-up comedian and actress
 Julie Goldman, stand-up comedian
 Amos Guttman, film director
 Todd Haynes, film director
 Matan Hodorov, journalist, TV presenter
 Nicholas Hytner, theatre and film director 
 Moisés Kaufman, award-winning Venezuelan-born playwright and director, US resident
 Asi Levy, actress
 Matt Lucas, comedian and actor
 Miriam Margolyes, award-winning British actress best known for her portrayal of Professor Sprout in the Harry Potter film series
Ezra Miller, actor
Ben Platt, actor, singer, and songwriter best known for his roles in Dear Evan Hansen, The Book of Mormon, and Pitch Perfect
 Max Rhyser, actor
 Jerome Robbins, choreographer and musical theatre director
 Joshua Rush, actor
 Jonathan Sagall, actor, director and screenwriter
 John Schlesinger, film director
 Antony Sher, actor
 Bryan Singer, film director
 Peter Spears, actor and film producer
 Mauritz Stiller, film director
 Gal Uchovsky, actor
 Bruce Vilanch, comedy writer and actor
 Dale Winton, TV presenter
 Evan Rachel Wood, actress, model, and musician
Joey Soloway, writer, director, producer, comedian

Musicians, composers, lyricists, and vocalists
 Aderet (singer), singer-songwriter, DJ, producer
 Howard Ashman, musical writer
 Babydaddy, member of Scissor Sisters
 Jean-Pierre Barda, singer, actor
 Frieda Belinfante, conductor (she has a Jewish father)
 Leonard Bernstein, composer and conductor
 Marc Blitzstein, composer
 Apollo Braun, musician, author
 Carrie Brownstein, guitarist in Sleater-Kinney
 Aaron Copland, composer
 Joel Derfner, musical theatre composer
 Michael Feinstein, singer and pianist
 William Finn, musical theatre composer, lyricist and librettist
 Ezra Furman, singer-songwriter
 God-Des (of God-Des and She)
 Ari Gold, pop singer
 Lesley Gore, pop singer
 Amir Fryszer Guttman, singer, musician, choreographer, actor, theater director
 Lorenz Hart, lyricist
 Jerry Herman, musical theatre composer and lyricist
 Vladimir Horowitz, classical pianist
 Janis Ian (born Janis Eddy Fink), American songwriter, singer, musician, columnist, and science fiction author
 Dana International, Israeli pop singer
 Rona Kenan, musician
 Dave Koz (born David Kozlowski), jazz saxophonist
 Adam Lambert, singer and runner-up on the 8th season of American Idol
 Ivri Lider, musician, singer
 Lyrik, music producer, singer-songwriter
 Barry Manilow, singer and songwriter
 Doron Medalie, songwriter, composer
 Jon Moss, drummer, member of Culture Club and The Damned
 Offer Nissim, DJ, record producer
 Laura Nyro, singer-songwriter
 Peaches, Canadian electro-punk musician and performance artist
 Phranc, singer-songwriter
 Yehuda Poliker, singer-songwriter, musician, producer, painter
 Yehudit Ravitz, singer-songwriter, composer, record producer
 Marc Shaiman, musical theatre and film composer
 Gil Shohat, music composer, conductor and pianist
 Troye Sivan, South African-born YouTuber and actor
 Harel Skaat, singer-songwriter
 Socalled, rapper
 Stephen Sondheim, musical theatre composer and lyricist
 Hovi Star, singer
 Michael Tilson Thomas, conductor, composer, and pianist
 Brandon Uranowitz, stage and television actor
 Yeho, singer, actor

Writers
 Leroy F. Aarons, journalist, editor, author, playwright, activist founder of the National Lesbian and Gay Journalists Association (NLGJA)
 Jon Robin Baitz, playwright and screenwriter
 Steve Berman, speculative fiction writer
 Betty Berzon, author, first psychotherapist in America to come out as gay to the public (1971)
 Kate Bornstein, writer, playwright, performance artist, gender theorist
 Jane Bowles, novelist and playwright
 Alfred Chester, novelist
Benjamin Cohen, journalist
 Nick Denton, founder of Gawker Media
 Joel Derfner, writer and memoirist
Gabe Dunn, writer, journalist, comedian, and actor
 Elana Dykewomon, American novelist
 Eve Ensler, playwright and performer
 György Faludy, poet
 Leslie Feinberg, activist, author
 Edward Field, poet
 Sanford Friedman, novelist
 Robert Friend, poet
 Masha Gessen, journalist, author, and activist
Allen Ginsberg, US Beat generation poet
 Richard Greenberg, playwright
 Jacob Israël de Haan, poet
 Marilyn Hacker, poet
 Aaron Hamburger, novelist
 Max Jacob, poet
 Chester Kallman, poet and librettist
Larry Kramer, playwright, author, film producer, public health advocate, LGBT rights activist, and founder of ACT UP
 Lisa Kron, playwright and performer
 Tony Kushner, playwright and screenwriter
 Arthur Laurents, playwright, screenwriter and librettist
 David Leavitt, novelist and short-story writer
Fran Lebowitz, author and public speaker
 Leo Lerman, writer/editor
 Sue-Ann Levy, columnist
 Michael Lowenthal, novelist
 Jay Michaelson, writer, columnist, author of God vs. Gay?
 Herbert Muschamp (1947–2007), New York Times architecture critic
 Leslea Newman, children's book author, short story writer, editor
 Harold Norse, poet
 Marcel Proust, novelist
 David Rakoff,  essayist
 Adrienne Rich, poet and essayist
 Paul Rudnick, playwright, screenwriter and columnist
 Muriel Rukeyser, poet
 Siegfried Sassoon, poet
 Sarah Schulman, journalist, writer and playwright
 Martin Sherman, playwright
 Andrew Solomon, writer on politics, culture and psychology
 Susan Sontag, essayist and novelist
 Gertrude Stein, writer
 Julian Stryjkowski, novelist
Bogi Takács, poet
 Paula Vogel, playwright and teacher
 Yona Wallach, poet

Artists and architects
Yael Bartana, Israeli artist and film-maker
Claude Cahun, French photographer and writer
 Robert Denning, American interior designer, from the age of 15 was the partner of Edgar de Evia, photographer and from 1960 both life and business partner of Vincent Fourcade, French interior designer
 Yishay Garbasz, artist in photography, installation, and video
 Nan Goldin, photographer
 Herbert List, photographer
 Maurice Sendak, illustrator and author of children's books as well as costume and set designer for films, theater and opera
 Simeon Solomon, painter
 Uri Gershuni, Israel photographer and educator
 Adi Nes, Israeli photographer
Arnold Scaasi, Canadian-born American fashion designer
Isaac Mizrahi, American fashion designer
Michael Kors, American sportswear fashion designer
Elmyr de Hory, Hungarian-born painter and art forger
Marc Jacobs, American fashion designer

Sports figures
 Robert Dover, six-time Olympic equestrian
Fredy Hirsch, German Jewish athlete and youth movement leader known for his attempts to save children during the Holocaust
Gili Mossinson, basketball player
 Tzipora Obziler, tennis player
 Renée Richards, tennis player
 Sue Bird, American-Israeli basketball player who has won three WNBA championships (2004, 2010, 2018), four Olympic gold medals, (2004, 2008, 2012, 2016), two NCAA Championships (2000 and 2002), and four FIBA World Cups (2002, 2010, 2014, and 2018)

Miscellaneous
 Sam Altman, CEO of OpenAI
 Stuart Appelbaum, American trade union leader 
Gad Beck, Holocaust survivor and memoirist
 Barbara Brenner, breast cancer activist and leader of Breast Cancer Action
 Roy Cohn, lawyer and co-counsel (with Robert F. Kennedy) to Senator Joseph McCarthy
 Jonathan Danilowitz, activist
 Barry Diller, media executive
 Sandi Simcha DuBowski, documentary filmmaker
 Brian Epstein, manager of The Beatles
 Raffi Freedman-Gurspan, first transgender person in the role of LGBT liaison to the White House
 David Geffen, film producer and record executive
 Jazz Jennings, transgender activist
Frank Kameny, prominent gay rights activist from 1957 to 2011 (born to Jewish parents but became an atheist)
 Cameron Kasky, gun control activist
 Eva Kotchever, Polish feminist, owner of the Eve's Hangout in New York, assassinated at Auschwitz
 Miz Cracker, American drag queen
 Ezra Nawi, Israeli human rights activist
 Dana Olmert, activist
 Yotam Ottolenghi, chef
 Etai Pinkas, activist
Felice Schragenheim, Jewish resistance fighter and Holocaust victim
Ari Shapiro, American radio journalist
 Joel Simkhai, Grindr founder and former CEO
 Randi Weingarten, current president of the American Federation of Teachers
 Riki Wilchins, activist
 Ron Yosef, activist

See also

Homosexuality and Judaism
Keshet Rabbis
LGBT clergy in Judaism
Timeline of LGBT Jewish history

Footnotes

External links
 World Congress of Gay & Lesbian Jews

 
LGBT Jews
Jews